Martina Biolo (born 12 January 1996) is an Italian professional racing cyclist. She rides for the Aromitalia Vaiano team.

See also
 List of 2015 UCI Women's Teams and riders

References

External links
 

1996 births
Living people
Italian female cyclists
Place of birth missing (living people)
People from Somma Lombardo
Cyclists from the Province of Varese